Lepturonota is a genus of longhorn beetles of the subfamily Lamiinae, containing the following species:

 Lepturonota inconspicua (Montrouzier, 1861)
 Lepturonota lifuana (Montrouzier, 1861)
 Lepturonota loyaltiana Breuning, 1953
 Lepturonota modesta (Montrouzier, 1861)
 Lepturonota tristis (Montrouzier, 1861)

References

Enicodini